John Winchcombe (by 1519 – 1574), of Bucklebury and Thatcham, Berkshire, was an English Member of Parliament in March 1553 for Reading, April 1554 and 1555 for Ludgershall and for Wootton Bassett in 1571. He was the son of John Winchcombe (died 1557) and his great great grandson became the first Winchcombe baronet.

References

English MPs 1553 (Edward VI)
English MPs 1554
People from Bucklebury
People from Thatcham
English MPs 1555
English MPs 1571
1519 births
1574 deaths